The Firebird Rocket is Volume 57 in the original The Hardy Boys Mystery Stories published by Grosset & Dunlap.

The book was written for the Stratemeyer Syndicate by Vincent Buranelli in 1978.

Plot summary
The Hardy Boys help their detective father, Fenton Hardy, search for a famous rocket scientist whose disappearance endangers the launching of the Firebird rocket from the Woomera Test Range. They are threatened multiple times, but still do not give up with their lives at risk. Frank and Joe Hardy aid their father and others. However, they soon learn that they are working for a criminal. While they are captured, the police arrive and rescue them, arresting the criminals except for the true mastermind who tries to flee. However, Frank and Joe stop the truck he uses and he is captured.

References

The Hardy Boys books
1978 American novels
1978 children's books
Grosset & Dunlap books
Novels set in Australia